The 1994 Peterborough City Council election took place on 5 May 1994 to elect members of Peterborough City Council in England. This was on the same day as other local elections.

Election result

References

1994
1990s in Cambridgeshire
Peterborough